Saetta ("arrow" or "lightning") was the name of at least three ships of the Italian Navy and may refer to:

 , a  launched in 1887 and broken up in 1908.
 , a  launched in 1932 and sunk in 1943.
 , a patrol boat launched in 1965 and retired in 1986.

Italian Navy ship names